The 1993 Giro d'Italia was the 76th edition of the Giro d'Italia, one of cycling's Grand Tours. The Giro began in Porto Azzurro, with a mountainous stage on 23 May, and Stage 11 occurred on 3 June with a stage from Senigallia. The race finished in Milan on 13 June.

Stage 11
3 June 1993 — Senigallia to Dozza,

Stage 12
4 June 1993 — Dozza to Asiago,

Stage 13
5 June 1993 — Asiago to Corvara,

Stage 14
6 June 1993 — Corvara to Corvara,

Stage 15
7 June 1993 — Corvara to Lumezzane,

Stage 16
8 June 1993 — Lumezzane to Borgo Val di Taro,

Stage 17
9 June 1993 — Varazze to Pontechianale,

Stage 18
10 June 1993 — Sampeyre to Fossano,

Stage 19
11 June 1993 — Pinerolo to Sestriere,  (ITT)

Stage 20
12 June 1993 — Turin to Santuario di Oropa,

Stage 21
13 June 1993 — Biella to Milan,

References

1993 Giro d'Italia
Giro d'Italia stages